William Schmollinger (fl. 1830s) was a famous cartographer.

He engraved a map of Hertfordshire with Thomas Moule, commonly known as Moule's Map of Hertfordshire.

References

19th-century cartographers
Year of birth unknown
Year of death unknown
19th-century engravers
19th-century English people
English cartographers